Ganauli is a village in Mashrakh, Saran district in the Indian state of Bihar. Ganauli is a part of Khajuri after 1930. There is population of about 4000. It has part of two Tola. Villagers smoothly going way to east side of mashrak there it have not a connecting road.

There is only one school in Ganauli village which caters to the educational needs of the students in the village.

Ganauli is connected by road to Khajuri, Ghoghiya, Bahuara and Pakri.

Villages in Saran district